World Intellectual Property Indicators (WIPI) is an annual statistical report published by the World Intellectual Property Organization (WIPO). The publication provides an overview of the activity in the areas of patents, utility models, trademarks, industrial designs, microorganisms, plant variety protection, geographical indications and the creative economy. 

The WIPI draws on intellectual property (IP) statistics collected from the 193 member States of WIPO. It provides the latest trends for IP activity at world, geographical region, country and IP office levels. WIPO has published the report annually since 2009.

Data sources 
The IP statistics data presented in the WIPI are taken from the WIPO Statistics Database and based primarily on data collected from national and regional IP offices, other competent authorities and publishers’ associations from around the world, through annual surveys consisting of multiple questionnaires. Data are also compiled by WIPO in processing international applications through the Patent Cooperation Treaty (PCT), the Madrid System for trademark protection and the Hague System for industrial design protection.

Patent family and technology data are extracted from the WIPO Statistics Database and from the PATSTAT database of the European Patent Office (EPO). Gross domestic product, income group classification and population data are from the World Development Indicators database of the World Bank. Geographical regions are those defined by the United Nations.

Accessing the report and its data 
The WIPI is available on WIPO website. Its underlying data can be extracted from the IP Statistics Data Center, which is WIPO’s online statistical database. 

The IP Facts and Figures report, drawn from the WIPI, serves as a quick reference guide for the most frequently used measure of IP activity. An online statistical country profiles also provides a set of IP statistics at country level.

More comprehensive data and analysis on the WIPO administrated Systems are available in a series of three publications: PCT Yearly Review, Madrid Yearly Review and Hague Yearly Review.

IP Statistics by IP office or by country of origin 
Applications received by offices from resident and non-resident applicants are referred to as office data, whereas applications filed by applicants at their national or regional office (resident applications) or at a foreign office (applications filed abroad) are referred to as origin data. For statistical purposes, WIPO defines the origin of an IP application to be the country or territory of residence of the first named applicant in the application.

Due to the nature of regional offices, the WIPI uses an equivalent application concept for reporting data by origin. Applications at regional offices are equivalent to multiple applications, one in each of the member states of those offices. For the EPO and the African Regional Intellectual Property Organization (ARIPO), the equivalent application is counted as one application abroad, if the applicant does not reside in a member state, or as one resident application and one application abroad, if the applicant resides in a member state.

Latest filing trends by country of origin 
The patent, trademark and industrial design data presented in this table come from the WIPI and show the application filing activity trend by country of origin and by year of filing.

Trademark application data refer to class counts – that is, the number of classes specified in applications. This provides the best comparison of international trademark filing activity across origins, because some jurisdictions may allow multiple classes of goods and services to be specified in a single application, whereas others require a separate application for each class. For the same reason, industrial design data refer to design counts, that is, the number of designs contained in applications.

Patents, trademarks, and industrial design (PCT) applications by Organizations

Top PCT patent applicants 2019 and 2020 
The Patent Cooperation Treaty (PCT) is an international patent law treaty, concluded in 1970. It provides a unified procedure for filing patent applications to protect inventions in each of its contracting states. A patent application filed under the PCT is called an international application, or PCT application.

Top Madrid trademark applicants (2020 and 2019) 
The Madrid System for the International Registration of Marks is a protocol to protect trademarks worldwide, in over 120 countries. The Madrid System has a centralized trademark registration system through a single application, in one language and with one set of fees (in one currency, the Swiss franc), protection can be obtained in member states and intergovernmental organizations. International registrations can then be modified, renewed or expanded, centrally through WIPO (rather than through each separate IP Office). The Madrid System can only be used by a natural person or a legal entity, which is a national, is domiciled or has a company in the territory of a member of the Madrid System.

Hague top applicants in 2020 and 2019 
The Hague System for the International Registration of Industrial Designs provides an international mechanism that secures protection of up to 100 designs in multiple countries or regions, through a single international application. International design applications are filed directly through WIPO. The domestic legal framework of each designated contracting party governs the design protection provided by the resulting international registrations. The Hague System does not require the applicant to file a national or regional design application.

Controversies

Taiwanese patents

Since Taiwan (ROC) is not a member of the United Nations, the number of patents filed in Taiwan is not reported. The number of patent applications filed with the Taiwan Intellectual Property Office (TIPO) in 2018 was 73,431, which would place it in 6th place worldwide for that year, or 2nd place per capita. In 2014, Bloomberg ranked Taiwan #1 in Patent Activity, using UN data. The last WIPO Indicators report to mention the name Taiwan was in 2017, noting the large number of patents by Foxconn.

China has been criticized for its efforts in the UN to reduce the visibility of Taiwan, including via WIPO; in 2020 Beijing reportedly retaliated to the failed election of a Chinese director-general of the organization by preventing the Wikimedia Foundation from gaining observer status at the WIPO, on the grounds that Wikimedia has a Taiwan subsidiary.

References

External links 
 World Intellectual Property Organization
 WIPO IP Statistics Data Center

Research
International rankings